Formosania is a genus of gastromyzontid loaches, most of which are endemic to mainland China.  Two species, F. lacustris and F. tengi, are endemic to Taiwan.

Species
There are currently 10 species recognized for this genus:
 Formosania chenyiyui (C. Y. Zheng, 1991)
 Formosania davidi (Sauvage, 1878)
 Formosania fascicauda (Nichols, 1926)
 Formosania fasciolata (H. G. Wang, Z. Y. Fan & Ying Chen, 2006)
 Formosania galericula (X. F. Zhang, 2011)
 Formosania lacustre (Steindachner, 1908)
 Formosania paucisquama (C. Y. Zheng, 1981)
 Formosania stigmata (Nichols, 1926)
 Formosania tengi (M. Watanabe, 1983)
 Formosania tinkhami (Herre, 1934)

References

Gastromyzontidae
Freshwater fish genera